Lucy Kérimée Gutteridge (born 28 November 1956) is an English retired actress. She is best known for her portrayal of Gloria Morgan Vanderbilt in the television miniseries Little Gloria... Happy at Last (1982), for which she received a Golden Globe Award nomination.

Life
Gutteridge was born in London, England, the eldest daughter of Major Bernard Hugh Gutteridge, Legion of Merit, a poet and writer, by his 1947 marriage (divorced 1971) to Nabila Farah Kérimée Halim, the daughter of H.H. Prince Muhammad Said Bey Halim of Egypt and his British second wife, Nabila Malika (née Morwena Bird). Through her mother, Gutteridge is a great-great-great-granddaughter of Muhammad Ali of Egypt, a Muslim subject of the Ottoman Empire (likely of Albanian ethnicity) who became the father of modern Egypt. She is thus a distant cousin of Egypt's last king, Fuad II. She has two sisters, Anne-Marie Morwenna Gutteridge (b. 1958) and Cosima Farah Gutteridge (b. 1962). She married Andrew Hawkins, a son of the actor Jack Hawkins, in London in 1978. They had a daughter, Alice, born 1979.

Filmography

Film

Television

Awards and nominations

References

External links
 

1956 births
Living people
English film actresses
English television actresses
20th-century English actresses
Actresses from London
People from Lewisham
English people of Egyptian descent